Sayn-Wittgenstein-Sayn-Altenkirchen (sometimes called Sayn-Altenkirchen) was a German county located in what is now Rhineland-Palatinate, near the river Sieg.

When Count William III of Sayn-Wittgenstein-Sayn died in 1623 without clear heirs, the Archbishop of Cologne occupied the vacant County until the succession was settled. It was settled by treaty in 1648, when the County was given jointly to Princesses Ernestine and Johanette, two sisters who were granddaughters of Count William, and their mother Dowager Countess Louise Juliane made regent. But shortly after the treaty, the County was split between the two. Ernestine's portion was called Sayn-Wittgenstein-Hachenburg (or Sayn-Hachenburg for short), a title which descended through the female line and is now a title of the Grand Duke of Luxembourg. Johanette's was Sayn-Wittgenstein-Sayn-Altenkirchen. Their mother remained regent for both Counties until 1652, when Johanette and Ernestine separately ruled their respective Counties. Sayn-Altenkirchen was inherited by Duke Johann William of Saxe-Eisenach — Johanette's son — and secondly by Duke William Henry of Saxe-Eisenach — Johanette's grandson. William Henry died childless and Sayn-Altenkirchen was inherited by Charles, Margrave of Brandenburg-Ansbach, Johanette's great-grandson.

The County of Sayn-Wittgenstein-Sayn-Altenkirchen ended when it was mediatised to Nassau-Weilburg in 1803.

Queen Caroline, wife of George II of the United Kingdom, was co-heiress to this County, but she never inherited it and her grandson George III was compensated for his loss of inheritance to it.

Counts of Sayn-Wittgenstein-Sayn-Altenkirchen (1648–1803)
 Johanette (1648–1701)
 Louise Juliane (Regent, 1648–52)
 William Henry, Duke of Saxe-Eisenach (1701–41)
 Charles, Burgrave of Brandenburg-Ansbach (1741–1803)

Mediatised to Nassau-Weilburg 1803

 References 
 Matthias Dahlhoff: Geschichte der Grafschaft Sayn, Dillenburg 1874.
 Daniel Schneider: Das Mühlengewerbe in der Grafschaft Sayn-Altenkirchen, in: Heimat-Jahrbuch des Kreises Altenkirchen, 59. Jahrgang, 2016, p. 219-237.
 Daniel Schneider: Die Entwicklung der Konfessionen in der Grafschaft Sayn im Grundriss, in: Heimat-Jahrbuch des Kreises Altenkirchen, 58. Jahrgang, 2015, p. 74-80.
 Daniel Schneider: Die Landstände in der Grafschaft Sayn sowie in Sayn-Altenkirchen und Sayn-Hachenburg, in: Jahrbuch für westdeutsche Landesgeschichte, 33. Jahrgang, 2007, p. 213-229.
 Daniel Schneider: Die Städtepolitik der Grafen von Sayn im Spätmittelalter, in: Jahrbuch für westdeutsche Landesgeschichte, 41. Jahrgang, 2015, pp. 33-49.
 M. Spindler, A. Kraus: Geschichte Frankens bis zum Ausgang des 18. Jahrhunderts, München 1997. .
 Gerhard Taddey: Lexikon der deutschen Geschichte, Stuttgart 1998. .
 Kreisverwaltung Altenkirchen (Hrsg.): Land an Sieg und Wied. Heimatkunde des Kreises Altenkirchen, Wissen 1987.
 Daniel Schneider: Die Geschichte der Ortsgemeinde Obererbach (Westerwald). Die Ortschaften Hacksen, Niedererbach, Obererbach und Koberstein vom Mittelalter bis zur Gegenwart'', 2 Bände, Obererbach 2009,  (mit Zusammenfassung der Entwicklung der Grafschaft Sayn-Altenkirchen).

1803 disestablishments
States and territories established in 1648
Former states and territories of Rhineland-Palatinate
1648 establishments in the Holy Roman Empire
History of the Westerwald